Zoran Milošević (Serbian Cyrillic: Зоран Милошевић; born November 23, 1975) is a Serbian retired footballer. Milošević played 7 games in CFR Cluj's 2005 Intertoto Cup campaign in which the club reached the final.

Honours
Jeonbuk Hyundai Motors
Korean FA Cup: 2000
Argeș Pitești
Liga II: 2007–08

References

External links
 Profile and stats at Srbijafudbal.
 
 

1975 births
Living people
Serbian footballers
Serbian expatriate footballers
Association football defenders
AEK Larnaca FC players
FC Argeș Pitești players
FK Teleoptik players
FK Zemun players
FK Železnik players
OFK Beograd players
FK Obilić players
FK Radnički 1923 players
FK Čukarički players
OFK Žarkovo players
CFR Cluj players
Jeonbuk Hyundai Motors players
Footballers from Belgrade
Expatriate footballers in Cyprus
Expatriate footballers in South Korea
Expatriate footballers in Romania
K League 1 players
Liga I players
Liga II players
Cypriot First Division players
Serbian expatriate sportspeople in South Korea
Serbian expatriate sportspeople in Romania
Serbian expatriate sportspeople in Cyprus